= Agafopod =

Agafopod (Russian: Агафопо́д) is a Russian Christian male first name. The name is derived from the Greek words agathos—meaning good—and pous/podos—meaning leg.

== See also ==
- Agafopus
