= Agafopus =

Agafopus (Russian: Агафопу́с) is a Russian Christian male first name. The name is derived from the Greek words agathos—meaning good—and pous/podos—meaning leg.

== See also ==
- Agafopod
